Truck & Bus Transportation was a Sydney-based monthly trade magazine covering aspects of transport in Australia.

Overview
Truck & Bus Transportation was established in July 1936 by Frank Shennen as Transportation. It was renamed Truck & Bus Transportation in March 1940. It originally covered all forms of transport, but after a short while rail and tram news was withdrawn, with it focussing on the bus and truck industries. It was sold in 1986 to the Murray family.

Shennen Publishing later founded  Railway Transportation and Freight & Container Transportation that shared some content with Truck & Bus Transportation. It ceased publication in June 2003.

References

Monthly magazines published in Australia
Transport magazines published in Australia
Magazines established in 1936
Magazines disestablished in 2003
Magazines published in Sydney
1936 establishments in Australia
2003 disestablishments in Australia